Retro Rocket is the follow up studio album by Pat Travers to Can Do (2013). The album was released on Cleopatra Records in March 2015.

Track listing

References 

2015 albums
Pat Travers albums